The 2014 Bayern Rundfahrt was the 35th edition of the Bayern Rundfahrt, an annual cycling road race. It was held between 28 May and 1 June, consisting of five stages, the fourth being an individual time trial. The stage race was part of the 2014 UCI Europe Tour, and was rated as a 2.HC event.

Mathias Frank was second and Thomas' teammate Vasil Kiryienka completed the podium.

Schedule

Teams
A total of 19 teams took part in the race. 8 were ProTeams, 6 were Professional Continental Teams and 5 were Continental Teams.

ProTeams

 
 
 
 
 
 
 
 

Professional Continental Teams

 
 
 
 
 
 

Continental Teams

 Team Heizomat
 LKT Team Brandenburg

Stages

Stage 1
28 May 2014 — Vilshofen an der Donau to Freilassing,

Stage 2
29 May 2014 — Freilassing to Reit im Winkl–Winklmoos-Alm,

Stage 3
30 May 2014 — Grassau to Neusäß,

Stage 4
31 May 2014 — Wassertrüdingen, individual time trial (ITT)

Stage 5
1 June 2014 — Wassertrüdingen to Nürnberg,

Classification leadership table

Standings

General classification

Sprints classification

Mountains classification

Young rider classification

Teams classification

References

External links

Bayern-Rundfahrt
Bayern-Rundfahrt
Bayern-Rundfahrt